Synpalamides is a genus of moths within the Castniidae family.

Selected species
Synpalamides chelone  (Hopffer, 1856) 
Synpalamides escalantei  (Miller, 1976) 
Synpalamides orestes  (Walker, 1854) 
Synpalamides phalaris  (Fabricius, 1793) 
Synpalamides rubrophalaris  (Houlbert, 1917)

References

Castniidae